Live at Montreaux Jazz Festival 2001 is an album by Burning Spear recorded at the Montreux Jazz Festival.

Track listing
All tracks composed by Winston Rodney
"The Youth"
"Jah Nuh Dead"
"Nyah Keith"
"Man in the Hills"
"Tumble Down"
"Old Marcus"
"Rocking Time"
"Columbus"
"Slavery Days"
"Postman"
"Happy Day"

Credits
Photos by Tom Asher Hammang
Manufactured and printed by Disc Makers, Pennsauken, NJ, USA
Mixed at RPM Recording Studio, New York, NY by Stephan Stewart and Burning Spear
Assistant Engineer: Andy Sarroff
Assistant tour manager: Sylvan Thomas
MC: Archbald Davis aka Tedo
Tour Engineer: Paul Bent
Tour Organizer and Business Administrator: Sonia Rodney
Album Design: Burning Spear

Musicians
Burning Spear - lead vocals, congos, percussion
Michael Ramsey - drums
Dave Richard - bass
Stephan Stewart - keyboards
Gilbert Spence - rhythm guitar
Cecil Ordonez - lead guitar
Micah Robinson - trombone
Clyde Cummings - saxophone
James Smith - trumpet

2002 live albums
Burning Spear live albums
Albums recorded at the Montreux Jazz Festival